Remembrance is an album by Norwegian pianist and composer Ketil Bjørnstad featuring saxophonist Tore Brunborg and drummer Jon Christensen recorded in 2009 and released on the ECM label in 2010.

Reception
The Allmusic review by Michael G. Nastos awarded the album 3½ stars stating "Remembrance certainly is a reflective, introspective recording, well suited for those times when pause for concern and a look at one's inner self is necessary".

Track listing
All compositions by Ketil Bjørnstad.

 "Remembrance I" - 4:56
 "Remembrance II" - 3:44
 "Remembrance III" - 5:00
 "Remembrance IV" - 4:17
 "Remembrance V" - 4:35   
 "Remembrance VI" - 6:12
 "Remembrance VII" - 3:54   
 "Remembrance VIII" - 4:58  
 "Remembrance IX" - 4:14   
 "Remembrance X" - 4:45
 "Remembrance XI" - 4:33

Personnel
Ketil Bjørnstad - piano
Tore Brunborg - tenor saxophone
Jon Christensen - drums

References

2010 albums
ECM Records albums
Ketil Bjørnstad albums
Albums produced by Manfred Eicher